Prozaedyus is an extinct genus of chlamyphorid armadillo that lived during the Middle Oligocene and Middle Miocene in what is now South America.

Description

It was a small-sized animal, and its life appearance was probably similar to that of the extant pichi,  and its length didn't exceeded more than 40 centimeters. It differed from the pichi by a well-developed scapular armor, the enlargement of its tympanic bulla and the ossification of its external auditory canal. Like several modern armadillos, Prozaedyus was characterized by its carapace formed by straight and narrow osteoderms, with small hair foramina. Foramina were often present along the sides of the osteoderms, as well as along its back. Prozaedyus had no teeth in its premaxilla,  while its maxilla had 7–8 teeth, and the mandible had 10.

Classification

The first fossils of this animal were discovered in Early Miocene terrains in Argentina, and were described in 1887 by Florentino Ameghino under the species Dasypus exilis. Ameghino later erected the genus Prozaedyus for these remais, finding several affinities with the modern genus Zaedyus. In addition to Prozaedyus exilis, the type species, several other species were later attributed to the genus by Ameghino, such as the larger Prozaedyus impressum, P. humilis, P. planus and P. tennuissimus. All these species are mainly distinguished by its osteoderm details. Fossils attributed to Prozaedyus have also been found in Bolivia and Chile.

Prozaedyus is one of the oldest members of the family Chlamyphoridae, which comprise most of the extant genera of armadillos. Ameghino considered this genus as an ancestor of the extant Zaedyus.

References

Ameghino, F. 1887. Enumeración sistemática de las especies de mamíferos fósiles coleccionados por Carlos Ameghino en los terrenos eocenos de Patagonia austral y depositados en el Museo La Plata. Boletín del Museo La Plata 1: 1-26.
Ameghino, F. 1891. Nuevos restos de mamíferos fósiles descubiertos por Carlos Ameghino en el Eoceno inferior de la Patagonia austral. Especies nuevas, adiciones y correcciones. Revista Argentina de Historia Natural 1 (5): 289-328.
Ameghino, F. 1897. Mammifères crétacés de l'Argentine. Boletín del Instituto Geográfico Argentino 18 (4–6), (7–9): 406-429, 431–521.
Ameghino, F. 1902. Première contribution à la connaissance de la faune mammalogique des couches à Colpodon. Boletín de la Acadamia Nacional de Ciencias (Córdoba) 17: 71-138.
A. Kramarz, A. Garrido, A. Forasiepi, M. Bond, and C. Tambussi. 2005. Estratigrafía y vertebrados (Aves y Mammalia) de la Formación Cerro Bandera, Mioceno Temprano de la Provincia del Neuquén, Argentina. Revista Geológica de Chile 32(2):273-291
A. A. Carlini, M. R. Ciancio, and G. J. Scillato-Yane. 2010. Middle Eocene-Early Miocene Dasypodidae (Xenarthra) of southern South America: biostratigraphy and palaeoecology. In R. H. Madden, A. A. Carlini, M. G. Vucetich, R. F. Kay (eds.), The Paleontology of Gran Barranca: Evolution and Environmental Change through the Middle Cenozoic of Patagonia 106–129

Prehistoric cingulates
Prehistoric placental genera
Miocene xenarthrans
Miocene genus first appearances
Miocene mammals of South America
Miocene genus extinctions
Paleogene Argentina
Neogene Argentina
Fossils of Argentina
Neogene Bolivia
Fossils of Bolivia
Neogene Chile
Fossils of Chile
Deseadan
Colhuehuapian
Santacrucian
Friasian
Fossil taxa described in 1887
Taxa named by Florentino Ameghino
Golfo San Jorge Basin
Sarmiento Formation